The Premier Volleyball League (PVL) is a women's professional volleyball league in the Philippines organized by Sports Vision Management Group, Inc. The league began in 2004 as the Shakey's V-League, a women's collegiate league.  Since 2011, the league became open to participation of corporate clubs and other non-collegiate teams.

The Spikers' Turf is the men's counterpart of the league.

History

Shakey's V-League (2004–2016)

The Premier Volleyball League was established in 2004 as the Shakey's V-League by Sports Vision Management Group, Inc. led by Jun Bernardino, Ricky Palou, Moying Martelino, and Rhea Navarro who were businessmen previously known for being men's basketball patrons. The Shakey's V-League was initially an inter-collegiate women's league with teams from the UAAP, NCAA, CESAFI among others playing in the league. The league's establishment was in cooperation with Shakey's Pizza (Philippines) which was the league's title sponsor until 2016. Prior to the league's establishment, the sport was in a state of stagnation since the 1990s with the highest level of volleyball being the women's collegiate tournament of the Metro Manila-based UAAP.

Among the unique rules implemented by the league upon its founding was allowing the collegiate and corporate managed teams to have maximum of two reinforcements - termed as "guest players" - on their roster. These guest players have ranged from alumni of their alma mater, other varsity graduates, high school recruits who use the ongoing tournament as preparation for the upcoming collegiate season and foreign imports (with the most notable being Jaroensri Bualee). Prior to 2011, guest players for colleges were eligible in both conferences (tournaments) held during the year - they were henceforth limited to the Open or Reinforced conferences until such format was succeeded by the one foreign reinforcement per team in 2016 (as "imports").

The UST Golden Tigresses won the inaugural V-League championship in 2004 defeating the DLSU Lady Archers. But the DLSU won the next three conferences, defeating UST in both conferences of Season 2 and the SSC-R Lady Stags in Season 3, sweeping both in the Finals of the three conferences.

The UST Tigresses returned to the League in 2007, after missing Season 3, winning both conferences of Season 4 by defeating the SSC-R Lady Stags in both finals series.

Year 2008 saw the crowning of two other schools aside from UST and DLSU. Adamson University won the championship in the first conference of Season 5 defeating the Ateneo Lady Eagles while San Sebastian College-Recoletos Lady Stags won the second conference of season 5 by sweeping the two comebacking champion teams: DLSU Lady Archers in the semifinals and UST Tigresses in the finals.

However, the Tigresses made history via a "three-peat" winning their fourth, fifth and sixth championships by sweeping both conferences of Season 6 by defeating SSC-R and Adamson, respectively in both championship series, and again winning the first conference of Season 7 by beating SSC-R for the fourth time in the finals. It was the battle for silver of the last two conferences when Adamson University faced the Lady Stags of SSC-R in the finals of the 2nd Conference Season 7. Adamson won its second V-League crown after defeating San Sebastian 2–1 in their Finals series.

In the 1st Conference Season 8, the Ateneo Lady Eagles won their first Shakey's V-League crown by thumping defending champions Adamson in the Finals. The 2nd Conference of Season 8 was renamed the Shakey's V-League Open Conference as it was opened to non-school teams. Four non-school teams joined the tournament, namely, the Philippine Army, Philippine Navy, Philippine Air Force and Maynilad. The Philippine Army won their first Shakey's V-League championship. Season 8-Open Conference, Shakey's V-League will also aired on GMA Life TV, GMA News TV and GMA Pinoy TV for the international viewers.

The Shakey's V-League welcomed the participation of corporate and non-collegiate teams starting 2011.

Season 9 was locally aired by the AKTV bloc on IBC13 and the Hyper channel.

Beginning its 10th Season, Shakey's V-League's new broadcasting partner was GMA News TV. Matches were aired at 1PM to 3PM during weekdays, and 12:45PM to 2:30PM during Saturdays. On May 26, 2013, Shakey's V-League held its first live TV coverage via GMA News TV. It is also announced that the Game 3 matches, both for Championship and the Battle for 3rd will be aired live on GMA News TV on June 2, 2013. In Season 10 Open Conference, Cagayan Valley made history as the Lady Rising Suns scored a 16–0 sweep en route to the team's first V-League title with a 2–0 series win over Smart-Maynilad Net Spikers.

On October 2, 2014, it was reported that a men's division will be included in its 21st conference with four teams.

On May 24, 2016, it was officially announced that Shakey's V-League will be aired on S+A Channel 23 following an agreement between Sports Vision, Shakey's and ABS-CBN Sports.

Premier Volleyball League (2017–2020)
The Shakey's V-League changed its name to the Premier Volleyball League (PVL) starting the 2017 season. The Spikers' Turf, which was spun-off from the league in 2015, was merged back to the PVL and was rebranded as the PVL's men's division. The renaming was part of a bid to secure more sponsorship for the league. There was a plan to rename the league to the Philippine Volleyball League instead but this was abandoned due to another entity already owning the name. The order of its conference was also changed with the league beginning with the import-laden Reinforced Conference and the Open Conference being held close to the start of the UAAP and NCAA tournaments which is usually held near the year's end. Prior to this, the Open Conference was traditionally held earlier. 

The PVL men's division ended with the 2018 PVL Collegiate Conference as its final tournament. The men's division reverted to the Spikers' Turf. The first tournament since the revert was the Open Conference in October 2018.

The 2020 season was indefinitely postponed due to the COVID-19 pandemic and there were plans to start the season with the Open Conference instead of the Reinforced Conference in September 2020 due to logistics issue of flying in imports for the latter.

Professional status and hiatus (2020)
In October 2020, the Philippines' Games and Amusements Board (GAB) issued a directive that players compensated for non-national team play would be considered as professionals, as well as all sporting events organized for profit. This has raised concerns regarding the status of leagues such as the PVL and its rival league, the Philippine Super Liga (PSL). The PVL in particular was concerned over the financial aspects of operating as a professional league.

In November 2020, the PVL announced that the league would turn professional starting with the 2021 season, believing it has enough women players to make the move. The league was already considering move for some time due to the collegiate league UAAP deciding to bar its rookies from playing in commercial leagues starting its UAAP Season 81 (2018-19) in anticipation that all college players would not be allowed to play in the PVL eventually. Prior to the league's professionalization, the PVL was considered as semi-professional and thus, its affairs were not supervised or regulated by the GAB. Six PVL teams—BaliPure, Banko Perlas, Choco Mucho, Creamline, Motolite, and Petro Gazz—agreed to the move of the PVL turning professional.

A new separate league, to be called the V-League, will be formed to accommodate collegiate and amateur teams which could no longer participate in the PVL due to the league's professionalization. Prior to its professionalization, the PVL hosted a collegiate conference.

Return of the PVL (2021–present)
Prior to the start of the 2021 season, five PSL teams—Chery Tiggo, Cignal HD, F2 Logistics, PLDT, and Sta. Lucia—joined the PVL, which rendered the PVL a "unified" professional league, leaving the PSL with only three inactive member teams.

In 2022, a plan to announce a rookie draft system to the PVL was revealed, which would have meant that teams will no longer be allowed to directly hire players like they did in the past. PVL President Ricky Palou said in an interview on One News' The Big Story that he enumerated the propositions set to improve the league, including a draft system and guidelines on trading players in 2023.

The PVL returns in 2021 with the organization of the 2021 Premier Volleyball League Open Conference staged in a bubble set-up. The recurrence of an entire season began the following year. In October 2022, PVL announced the use of video challenge system for the first time in the return of the Reinforced Conference after three years. Sports Vision relaunched its collegiate competitions as the V-League with twelve men's teams and eight women's teams.

The 2023 season, saw the rebranding of the Open Conference as the All-Filipino Conference to better reflect the fact that only Filipino players could compete in said conference.

Teams

Active club teams

Inactive club teams

Result summary

Women's division

Men's division

Champions

Women's division

Men's division

Awardees

Playing venues 
The Premier Volleyball League (as well as its predecessor) does not use a "home-and-away" format since most teams are managed by corporations. Games are presently held at the Filoil EcoOil Centre in San Juan and PhilSports Arena in Pasig. 

During the semi-finals to championship rounds of the Shakey's V-League season 10, games started to be held at the SM Mall of Asia Arena in Pasay and the Smart Araneta Coliseum in Quezon City to accommodate larger numbers of spectators. Other previous venues included the Lyceum of the Philippines University gymnasium, the Blue Eagle Gym and the Rizal Memorial Coliseum.

See also 
Spikers' Turf
Beach Volleyball Republic
Home and Away League-Philippines
NCAA Volleyball Championship (Philippines)
Philippine Super Liga
Shakey's Super League
UAAP Volleyball Championship

References

External links 
 pvl.ph

College women's volleyball in the Philippines
Shakey's V-League
Volleyball competitions in the Philippines
Sports leagues established in 2004
2004 establishments in the Philippines
Philippines
College women's volleyball tournaments in the Philippines
Professional sports leagues in the Philippines